is a species of colourful dorid nudibranch, a sea slug, a shell-less marine gastropod mollusc in the family Chromodorididae.

Distribution
This sea slug is widespread throughout the tropical waters of the Indo-Pacific area, from the oriental African coast to Hawaii.

Description
Ceratosoma tenue can grow to a maximal size of  length. 
The body colouration is extremely variable but is always composed of bright colours. However, the body colouration is not a valuable criterion of determination for this species because it can easily be confused with Ceratosoma tribolatum.
The physical distinctive criteria are three mantle lobes on the first half of the body on each side and the purple margin of the mantle and foot is a dotted line.
Another specificity of many species of Ceratosoma is the kind of "horn" covering the gills, which is like a lure and acts as a defensive chemical weapon that will scare any potential predator who dares to bite this part.
The gills and the rhinophores are retractile in internal sheaths.

Behavior

Ceratosoma tenue is active all time and has a diurnal activity.

Feeding
Ceratosoma tenue feeds on sponges of the genus Dysidea.

References

External links
 

Chromodorididae
Gastropods described in 1876